CCNM may refer to:
Canadian College of Naturopathic Medicine
Canadian Council of Natural Mothers

See also
CCNMTL or Columbia Center for New Media Teaching and Learning